Princess Margaret, Countess of Snowdon,  (Margaret Rose; 21 August 1930 – 9 February 2002) was the younger daughter of King George VI and Queen Elizabeth The Queen Mother, and the younger sister and only sibling of Queen Elizabeth II.

Margaret was born when her parents were the Duke and Duchess of York, and she spent much of her childhood with them and her elder sister. Her life changed at the age of six, when her father ascended the British throne following the abdication of his brother Edward VIII. Margaret's sister became heir presumptive, with Margaret second in line to the throne. Her position in the line of succession diminished over the following decades as Elizabeth's children and grandchildren were born. During the Second World War, the two sisters stayed at Windsor Castle despite suggestions to evacuate them to Canada. During the war years, Margaret was too young to perform official duties and continued her education, being nine years old when the war broke out and turning fifteen just after hostilities ended.

From the 1950s onwards, Margaret became one of the world's most celebrated socialites, famed for her glamorous lifestyle and reputed romances. Most famously, she fell in love in the early 1950s with Peter Townsend, a married RAF officer in the royal household. In 1952, her father died, her sister became queen, and Townsend divorced his wife. He proposed to Margaret early in the following year. Many in the government believed that he would be an unsuitable husband for the Queen's 22-year-old sister, and the Archbishop of Canterbury refused to countenance her marriage to a divorced man. Margaret abandoned her plans with Townsend and married Antony Armstrong-Jones in 1960; the Queen created him Earl of Snowdon. The couple had two children, David and Sarah, and divorced in 1978. Margaret did not remarry.

Margaret was a controversial member of the British royal family. Her divorce received much negative publicity, and her private life was for many years the subject of speculation by media and royal watchers. Her health deteriorated in the last twenty years of her life. She was a heavy smoker for most of her adult life and had a lung operation in 1985, a bout of pneumonia in 1993 as well as three strokes between 1998 and 2001. Margaret died in February 2002 aged 71, after suffering her fourth stroke.

Early life
Princess Margaret was born at 9:22 p.m. on 21 August 1930 at Glamis Castle in Scotland, her mother's ancestral home, and was affectionately known as Margot within the royal family. She was the first member of the royal family in direct line of succession to be born in Scotland since the 1600s. She was delivered by Sir Henry Simson, the royal obstetrician. The Home Secretary, J. R. Clynes, was present to verify the birth. The registration of her birth was delayed for several days to avoid her being numbered thirteen in the parish register. Margaret was baptised in the private chapel of Buckingham Palace on 30 October 1930 by Cosmo Lang, the Archbishop of Canterbury.

At the time of her birth, Margaret was fourth in the line of succession to the British throne. Her father was the Duke of York (later King George VI), the second son of King George V and Queen Mary. Her mother was the Duchess of York (later Queen Elizabeth The Queen Mother), the youngest daughter of the 14th Earl and the Countess of Strathmore and Kinghorne. The Duchess of York originally wanted to name her second daughter Ann Margaret, as she explained to Queen Mary in a letter: "I am very anxious to call her Ann Margaret, as I think Ann of York sounds pretty, & Elizabeth and Ann go so well together." King George V disliked the name Ann but approved of the alternative, Margaret Rose.

Margaret's early life was spent primarily at the Yorks' residences at 145 Piccadilly (their town house in London) and Royal Lodge in Windsor. The Yorks were perceived by the public as an ideal family: father, mother and children, but unfounded rumours that Margaret was deaf and mute were not completely dispelled until her first main public appearance at her uncle Prince George's wedding in 1934.

Margaret was educated alongside her sister, Elizabeth, by their Scottish governess, Marion Crawford. Margaret's education was mainly supervised by her mother, who in the words of Randolph Churchill "never aimed at bringing her daughters up to be more than nicely behaved young ladies". When Queen Mary insisted upon the importance of education, the Duchess of York commented, "I don't know what she meant. After all I and my sisters only had governesses and we all married well — one of us very well". Margaret was resentful about her limited education, especially in later years, and aimed criticism at her mother. However, Margaret's mother told a friend that she "regretted" that her daughters did not go to school like other children, and the employment of a governess rather than sending the girls to school may have been done only at the insistence of King George V. J. M. Barrie, author of Peter Pan, read stories to the sisters as children.

Margaret's grandfather, George V, died when she was five, and her uncle acceded to the throne as King Edward VIII. Less than a year later, on 11 December 1936, in the abdication crisis, he left the throne to marry Wallis Simpson, a twice-divorced American, whom neither the Church of England nor the Dominion governments would accept as queen. The Church did not recognise the marriage of a divorced woman with a living ex-husband as valid. Edward's abdication made a reluctant Duke of York the new king, and Margaret became second in line to the throne, with the title The Princess Margaret to indicate her status as a child of the sovereign. The family moved into Buckingham Palace; Margaret's room overlooked The Mall.

Margaret was a Brownie in the 1st Buckingham Palace Brownie Pack, formed in 1937. She was also a Girl Guide and later a Sea Ranger. She served as President of Girlguiding UK from 1965 until her death on 9 February 2002.

At the outbreak of World War II, Margaret and her sister were at Birkhall, on the Balmoral Castle estate, where they stayed until Christmas 1939, enduring nights so cold that drinking water in carafes by their bedside froze. They spent Christmas at Sandringham House before moving to Windsor Castle, just outside London, for much of the remainder of the war. Viscount Hailsham wrote to Prime Minister Winston Churchill to advise the evacuation of the princesses to the greater safety of Canada, to which their mother famously replied, "The children won't go without me. I won't leave without the King. And the King will never leave." At Windsor, the princesses staged pantomimes at Christmas in aid of the Queen's Wool Fund, which bought yarn to knit into military garments. In 1940, Margaret sat next to Elizabeth during their radio broadcast for the BBC's Children's Hour, addressing other children who had been evacuated from cities. Margaret spoke at the end by wishing all the children goodnight.

Unlike other members of the royal family, Margaret was not expected to undertake any public or official duties during the war. She developed her skills at singing and playing the piano, often show tunes from stage musicals. Her contemporaries thought she was spoiled by her parents, especially her father, who allowed her to take liberties not usually permissible, such as being allowed to stay up to dinner at the age of thirteen.

Crawford despaired at the attention Margaret was getting, writing to friends: "Could you this year only ask Princess Elizabeth to your party? ... Princess Margaret does draw all the attention and Princess Elizabeth lets her do that." Elizabeth, however, did not mind this, and commented, "Oh, it's so much easier when Margaret's there—everybody laughs at what Margaret says". King George described Elizabeth as his pride and Margaret as his joy.

Post-war years

At the end of the war in 1945, Margaret appeared on the balcony at Buckingham Palace with her family and Prime Minister Winston Churchill. Afterwards, both Elizabeth and Margaret joined the crowds outside the palace, incognito, chanting, "We want the King, we want the Queen!"

On 15 April 1946, Margaret was confirmed into the Church of England. On 1 February 1947, she, Elizabeth and their parents embarked on a state tour of Southern Africa. The three-month-long visit was Margaret's first visit abroad, and she later claimed that she remembered "every minute of it". Margaret's chaperone was Peter Townsend, the King's equerry and very firm toward Margaret, whom he apparently considered an indulged child. Later that year, Margaret was a bridesmaid at Elizabeth's wedding. In the next three years, Elizabeth had two children, Charles and Anne, whose births moved Margaret further down the line of succession.

In 1950, the former royal governess, Marion Crawford, published an unauthorized biography of Elizabeth's and Margaret's childhood years, titled The Little Princesses, in which she described Margaret's "light-hearted fun and frolics" and her "amusing and outrageous ... antics".

The Margaret Set 
Around the time of Princess Elizabeth's wedding in November 1947, the press started to follow the social life of "unconventional" Margaret and her reputation for vivacity and wit. As a beautiful young woman, with an 18-inch waist and "vivid blue eyes", Margaret enjoyed socialising with high society and young aristocrats, including Sharman Douglas, the daughter of the American ambassador, Lewis Williams Douglas. A celebrated beauty known for her glamour and fashion sense, Margaret was often featured in the press at balls, parties, and nightclubs with friends who became known as the "Margaret Set". The number of her official engagements increased (they included a tour of Italy, Switzerland, and France), and she joined a growing number of charitable organisations as president or patron.

Favoured haunts of the Margaret Set were The 400 Club, the Café de Paris and the Mirabelle restaurant. Anticipation of an engagement or romance between Margaret and a member of her set were often reported. In 1948, international news grew that her engagement to "Sunny", the Marquess of Blandford, would be announced on her 18th birthday. Similar speculation moved to the Hon. Peter Ward, then Billy Wallace and others. The set also mixed with celebrities, including Danny Kaye, whom she met after watching him perform at the London Palladium in February 1948. He was soon accepted by the royal social circle. In July 1949, at a fancy dress ball at the American Ambassador's residence, Margaret performed the can-can on stage, accompanied by Douglas and ten other costumed girls. A press commotion ensued, with Kaye denying he had taught Margaret the dance. Press interest could be intrusive. During a private visit to Paris in 1951, Margaret and Prince Nicholas of Yugoslavia were followed into a nightclub by a paparazzo who took photographs of them until British detectives physically removed him from the club.

In 1952, although Margaret attended parties and debutante balls with friends such as Douglas and Mark Bonham Carter, the set were seen infrequently together. They regrouped in time for Coronation season social functions. In May 1953, Margaret met singer Eddie Fisher when he performed at the Red, White and Blue Ball. She asked him to her table and he was "invited to all sorts of parties". Margaret fell out with him in 1957, but years later, Fisher still claimed the night he was introduced to her was the greatest thrill of his lifetime. In June 1954, the Set performed the Edgar Wallace play The Frog at the Scala Theatre. It was organized by Margaret's by now best girlfriend Judy Montagu with Margaret as Assistant Director. It drew praise for raising £10,500 for charity, but criticism for incompetent performances. By the mid 1950s, although still seen at fashionable nightspots and theatre premieres, the set was depleted by its members getting married. As she reached her late twenties unmarried, the press increasingly turned from predicting whom she might marry to suspecting she would remain a spinster.

'Romances' and the press (1947–1959) 
The press avidly discussed "the world's most eligible bachelor-girl" and her alleged romances with more than 30 bachelors, including David Mountbatten and Michael I of Romania, Dominic Elliot, Colin Tennant (later Baron Glenconner), Prince Henry of Hesse-Kassel,  and future Prime Minister of Canada John Turner. Most had titles and almost all were wealthy. Blandford and Lord Dalkeith, both wealthy sons of dukes, were the likeliest potential husbands. Her family reportedly hoped that Margaret would marry Dalkeith, but, unlike him, the princess was uninterested in the outdoors. Billy Wallace, sole heir to a £2.8 million (£ million today) fortune and an old friend, was reportedly Margaret's favourite date during the mid-1950s. During her 21st birthday party at Balmoral in August 1951, the press was disappointed to only photograph Margaret with Townsend, always in the background of pictures of royal appearances, and to her parents a safe companion as Elizabeth's duties increased. The following month her father underwent surgery for lung cancer, and Margaret was appointed one of the Counsellors of State who undertook the King's official duties while he was incapacitated. Her father died five months later, on 6 February 1952, and her sister became Queen.

Romance with Peter Townsend

Early relationship
During the war, the King suggested choosing palace aides who were highly qualified men from the military, instead of only aristocrats. Told that a handsome war hero had arrived, the princesses met Townsend, the new equerry, on his first day at Buckingham Palace in 1944; Elizabeth reportedly told her sister, 13 years old, "Bad luck, he's married". A temporary assignment of three months from the RAF became permanent. The King and Queen were fond of Townsend; the King reportedly saw the calm and efficient combat veteran as the son he never had. He may have been aware of his daughter's infatuation with the non-titled and non-wealthy Townsend, reportedly seeing the courtier reluctantly obey the princess's order to carry her up palace stairs after a party.

Townsend was so often near Margaret that gossip columnists overlooked him as a suitor for the princess. When their relationship began is unclear. The princess told friends she fell in love with the equerry during the 1947 South Africa tour, where they often went riding together. Her biographer Craig Brown stated that, according to a National Trust curator, Townsend requested the bedroom next to hers during a trip to Belfast in October 1947. In November 1948, they attended the inauguration of Queen Juliana of the Netherlands. In later life, Townsend admitted at this point there was an attraction between them, but neither of them ever acknowledged it to one another. Not long after, he discovered his wife Rosemary was involved in an extramarital affair, which ended. Contemporary anecdotes about their closeness then dissipated until late 1950, when friendship seems to have rekindled, coinciding with Townsend's appointment as Deputy Master of the Household and the breakdown of his marriage.

From the spring of 1951 came several testimonies of a growing romantic attraction. A footman told how the King diverted the pair's picnic plans, adding that whatever the King and Queen knew about the developing relationship, few royal staff failed to notice as it was obvious to them. Townsend said that his love for her began in Balmoral in 1951, and recalled an incident there in August when the princess woke him from a nap after a picnic lunch while the King watched, to suggest the King knew. Townsend and his wife separated in 1951, which was noticed by the press by July. 

Margaret was grief-stricken by her father's death and was prescribed sedatives to help her sleep. Of her father she wrote, "He was such a wonderful person, the very heart and centre of our happy family." She was consoled by her deeply held Christian beliefs, sometimes attending church twice daily. She re-emerged attending events with her family in April and returned to public duties and the social scene when official mourning ended in June. American newspapers noted her increasing vitality and speculated that she must be in love. With the widowed Queen Mother, Margaret moved out of Buckingham Palace and into Clarence House in May 1953, while her older sister, now Queen, and her family moved out of Clarence House and into Buckingham Palace. After the king's death, Townsend was appointed Comptroller of Margaret's mother's restructured household. 

In June 1952, the estranged Townsends hosted Queen Elizabeth II, Prince Philip and Princess Margaret at a cocktail party at their home. A month later, Rosemary Townsend and her new partner John de László attended judging at the Royal Windsor Horse Show. It is thought the romance between Margaret and Townsend began around this time. The first reports that Townsend and Margaret wished to marry began in August 1952, but these remained uncommon. The Townsend divorce in November was mentioned little in Britain and in greater detail abroad. After the divorce was finalized in December 1952, however, rumours spread about him and Margaret; the divorce, and shared grief over the death of the king in February 1952, likely helped them come together within the privacy of Clarence House, where the princess had her own apartment.

Marriage proposal
Private Secretary to the Queen Sir Alan Lascelles wrote that Townsend came to tell him he had asked Margaret to marry him shortly before Christmas 1952. Other sources claim it occurred in February or April 1953. He was 15 years her senior and had two children from his previous marriage. Margaret accepted and informed her sister, the Queen, whose consent was required by the Royal Marriages Act 1772. During the abdication crisis, the Church of England refused to countenance the remarriage of the divorced. Queen Mary had recently died, and, after the coronation of Elizabeth II, the new queen planned to tour the Commonwealth for six months. She told her sister, "Under the circumstances, it isn't unreasonable for me to ask you to wait a year", and to keep the relationship secret until after the coronation.

Although foreign media speculated on Margaret and Townsend's relationship, the British press did not. After reporters saw her plucking fluff from his coat during the coronation on 2 June 1953—"I never thought a thing about it, and neither did Margaret", Townsend later said; "After that the storm broke"—The People first mentioned the relationship in Britain on 14 June. With the headline "They Must Deny it NOW", the front-page article warned that "scandalous rumours about Princess Margaret are racing around the world", which the newspaper stated were "of course, utterly untrue". The foreign press believed that the Regency Act 1953—which made Prince Philip, the Queen's husband, regent instead of Margaret on the Queen's death—was enacted to allow the princess to marry Townsend, but as late as 23 July most other British newspapers except the Daily Mirror did not discuss the rumours. Acting Prime Minister Rab Butler asked that "deplorable speculation" end, without mentioning Margaret or Townsend.

The constitutional crisis that the proposed marriage caused was public. The Queen was advised by Lascelles to post Townsend abroad, but she refused and instead transferred him from the Queen Mother's household to her own, although Townsend did not accompany Margaret as planned on a tour of Southern Rhodesia. Prime Minister Churchill personally approved of "a lovely young royal lady married to a gallant young airman" but his wife reminded Churchill that he had made the same mistake during the abdication crisis. His cabinet refused to approve the marriage, and Geoffrey Fisher, Archbishop of Canterbury, did not approve of Margaret marrying a divorced man; opponents said that the marriage would threaten the monarchy as Edward VIII's had. The Church of England Newspaper said that Margaret "is a dutiful churchwoman who knows what strong views leaders of the church hold in this matter", but the Sunday Express—which had supported Edward and Wallis—asked, "IF THEY WANT TO MARRY, WHY SHOULDN'T THEY?".

Churchill discussed the marriage at the 1953 Commonwealth Prime Ministers' Conference held with the coronation; the Statute of Westminster 1931 requires Dominion parliaments to also approve any Bill of Renunciation changing the line of succession. The Canadian government stated that altering the line twice in 25 years would harm the monarchy. Churchill informed the Queen that both his cabinet and Dominion prime ministers were against the marriage, and that Parliament would not approve a marriage that would be unrecognized by the Church of England unless Margaret renounced her rights to the throne.

Prince Philip was reportedly the most opposed to Townsend in the royal family, while Margaret's mother and sister wanted her to be happy but could not approve of the marriage. Besides Townsend's divorce, two major problems were financial and constitutional. Margaret did not possess her sister's large fortune and would need the £6,000 annual civil list allowance and £15,000 additional allowance Parliament had provided for her upon a suitable marriage. She did not object to being removed from the line of succession to the throne as the Queen and all her children dying was unlikely, but receiving parliamentary approval for the marriage would be difficult and uncertain. At the age of 25 Margaret would not need Elizabeth's permission under the 1772 Act; she could, after notifying the Privy Council of the United Kingdom, marry in one year if Parliament did not prevent her. If Churchill told the Queen, however, one could easily leave the line of succession, another could easily enter the line, dangerous for a hereditary monarchy.

The Queen told the couple to wait until 1955, when Margaret would be 25, avoiding the Queen having to publicly disapprove of her sister's marriage. Lascelles—who compared Townsend to Theudas "boasting himself to be somebody"—hoped that separating him and Margaret would end their romance. Churchill arranged for Townsend's assignment as air attaché at the British Embassy in Brussels; he was sent on 15 July 1953, before Margaret's return from Rhodesia on 30 July. The assignment was so sudden that the British ambassador learned about it from a newspaper. Although the princess and Townsend knew about his new job, they had reportedly been promised a few days together before his departure.

Press coverage
For two years, press speculation continued. In Brussels, Townsend only said that "The word must come from somebody else". He avoided parties and being seen with women. With few duties (the sinecure was abolished after him), Townsend improved his French and horsemanship. He joined a Belgian show jumping club and rode in races around Europe. Margaret was told by the Church that she would be unable to receive communion if she married a divorced man. Three quarters of Sunday Express readers opposed the relationship, and Mass-Observation recorded criticism of the "silly little fool" as a poor example for young women who emulated her. Other newspaper polls showed popular support for Margaret's personal choice, regardless of Church teaching or government. Ninety-seven per cent of Daily Mirror readers supported marriage, and a Daily Express editorial stated that even if the Archbishop of Canterbury was displeased, "she would best please the vast majority of ordinary folk [by finding] happiness for herself".

The couple were not restricted on communicating by mail and telephone. Margaret worked with friends on charity productions of Lord and Lady Algy and The Frog, and publicly dated men such as Tennant and Wallace. In January 1955, she made the first of many trips to the Caribbean, perhaps to distract, and as a reward for being apart, from Townsend. The attaché secretly travelled to Britain; while the palace was aware of one visit, he reportedly made other trips for nights and weekends with the princess at Clarence House—her apartment had its own front door—and friends' homes.

That spring Townsend for the first time spoke to the press: "I am sick of being made to hide in my apartment like a thief", but whether he could marry "involves more people than myself". He reportedly believed that his exile from Margaret would soon end, their love was strong, and that the British people would support marrying. Townsend received a bodyguard and police guard around his apartment after the Belgian government received threats on his life, but the British government still said nothing. Stating that people were more interested in the couple than the recent 1955 United Kingdom general election, on 29 May the Daily Express published an editorial demanding that Buckingham Palace confirm or deny the rumours.
 
The press described Margaret's 25th birthday, 21 August 1955, as the day she was free to marry, and expected an announcement about Townsend soon. Three hundred journalists waited outside Balmoral, four times as many as those later following Diana, Princess of Wales. "COME ON MARGARET!", the Daily Mirrors front page said two days earlier, asking her to "please make up your mind!". On 12 October Townsend returned from Brussels as Margaret's suitor. The royal family devised a system in which it did not host Townsend, but he and Margaret formally courted each other at dinner parties hosted by friends such as Mark Bonham Carter. A Gallup poll found that 59% of Britons approved of their marrying, with 17% opposed. Women in the East End of London shouted "Go on, Marg, do what you want" at the princess. Although the couple was never seen together in public during this time, the general consensus was that they would marry. Crowds waited outside Clarence House, and a global audience read daily updates and rumours on newspaper front pages.

"Nothing much else than Princess Margaret's affairs is being talked of in this country", The Manchester Guardian said on 15 October. "NOW – THE NATION WAITS" was a typical headline. Observers interpreted Buckingham Palace's request to the press to respect Margaret's privacy—the first time the palace discussed the princess's recent personal life—as evidence of an imminent betrothal announcement, probably before the Opening of Parliament on 25 October. As no announcement occurred—the Daily Mirror on 17 October showed a photograph of Margaret's left hand with the headline "NO RING YET!"—the press wondered why. Parliamentarians "are frankly puzzled by the way the affair has been handled", the News Chronicle wrote. "If a marriage is on, they ask, why not announce it quickly? If there is to be no marriage, why allow the couple to continue to meet without a clear denial of the rumours?"

Why a betrothal did not occur is unclear. Margaret may have been uncertain of her desire, having written to Prime Minister Anthony Eden in August that "It is only by seeing him in this way that I feel I can properly decide whether I can marry him or not". Margaret may have told Townsend as early as 12 October that governmental and familial opposition to their marriage had not changed; it is possible that neither they nor the Queen fully understood until that year how difficult the 1772 Act made a royal marriage without the monarch's permission. An influential 26 October editorial in The Times stating that "The QUEEN's sister married to a divorced man (even though the innocent party) would be irrevocably disqualified from playing her part in the essential royal function" represented The Establishment's view of what it considered a possibly dangerous crisis. It convinced many, who had believed that the media were exaggerating, that the princess really might defy the Church and royal standards. Leslie Weatherhead, President of the Methodist Conference, now criticized the proposed marriage.

Townsend recalled that "we felt mute and numbed at the centre of this maelstrom"; the Queen also wanted the media circus to end. Townsend only had his RAF income and, other than a talent for writing, had no experience in other work. He wrote in his autobiography that the princess "could have married me only if she had been prepared to give up everything -- her position, her prestige, her privy purse. I simply hadn't the weight, I knew it, to counterbalance all she would have lost" for what Kenneth Rose described as "life in a cottage on a Group Captain's salary". Royal historian Hugo Vickers wrote that "Lascelles's separation plan had worked and the love between them had died". Margaret's authorized biographer Christopher Warwick said that "having spent two years apart, they were no longer as in love as they had been. Townsend was not the love of her life – the love of her life was her father, King George VI, whom she adored".

More than 100 journalists waited at Balmoral when Eden arrived to discuss the marriage with the Queen and Margaret on 1 October 1955. Lord Kilmuir, the Lord Chancellor, that month prepared a secret government document on the proposed marriage. According to a 1958 biography of Townsend by Norman Barrymaine and other accounts, Eden said that his government would oppose in Parliament Margaret retaining her royal status. Parliament might pass resolutions opposing the marriage, which the people would see as a disagreement between government and monarchy; Lord Salisbury, a High Anglican, might resign from the government rather than help pass a Bill of Renunciation. While the government could not prevent the marriage when Margaret became a private individual after a Bill of Renunciation, she would no longer be a Counsellor of State and would lose her civil list allowance; otherwise, taxpayers would subsidise a divorced man and the princess's new stepsons. The Church would consider any children from the marriage to be illegitimate. Eden recommended that, like Edward VIII and Wallis, Margaret and Townsend leave Britain for several years.

Papers released in 2004 to the National Archives disagree. They show that the Queen and Eden (who had been divorced and remarried himself) planned to amend the 1772 Act. Margaret would have been able to marry Townsend by removing her and any children from the marriage from the line of succession, and thus the Queen's permission would no longer be necessary. Margaret would be allowed to keep her royal title and her allowance, stay in the country, and even continue with her public duties. Eden described the Queen's attitude in a letter on the subject to the Commonwealth prime ministers as "Her Majesty would not wish to stand in the way of her sister's happiness". Eden himself was sympathetic; "Exclusion from the Succession would not entail any other change in Princess Margaret's position as a member of the Royal Family", he wrote.

On 28 October 1955 final draft of the plan, Margaret would announce that she would marry Townsend and leave the line of succession. As prearranged by Eden, the Queen would consult with the British and Commonwealth governments, and then ask them to amend the 1772 Act. Eden would have told Parliament that the Act was "out of harmony with modern conditions".  Kilmuir had advised Eden that the 1772 Act was flawed and might not apply to Margaret anyway. Kilmuir estimated that 75% of Britons would approve of allowing the marriage.

Three days after the final draft of the proposal was produced, Margaret announced on 31 October 1955 that she would not marry Townsend. The decision not to marry was made on the 24th and for the following week, Margaret disputed the wording of her statement, which was released on the 31st. It is unverified what or when she was told about proposals, drafted on the 28th, four days after the decision was made. By the early 1980s she was still protesting to biographers that the couple had been given false hope marriage was possible and she would have ended the relationship sooner had she been informed otherwise.

The Daily Mirror on 28 October discussed The Timess editorial with the headline "THIS CRUEL PLAN MUST BE EXPOSED". Although Margaret and Townsend had read the editorial the newspaper denounced as from "a dusty world and a forgotten age", they had earlier made their decision and written an announcement.

End of relationship
On 31 October 1955, Margaret issued a statement:

"Thoroughly drained, thoroughly demoralized", Margaret later said, she and Townsend wrote the statement together. She refused when Oliver Dawnay, the Queen Mother's private secretary, asked to remove the word "devotion". The written statement, signed "Margaret", was the first official confirmation of the relationship. Some Britons were disbelieving or angry while others, including clergy, were proud of the princess for choosing duty and faith; newspapers were evenly divided on the decision. Mass-Observation recorded indifference or criticism of the couple among men, but great interest among women, whether for or against. Kenneth Tynan, John Minton, Ronald Searle, and others signed an open letter from "the younger generation". Published in the Daily Express on 4 November, the letter said that the end of the relationship had exposed The Establishment and "our national hypocrisy".

Townsend recalled that "We had reached the end of the road, our feelings for one another were unchanged, but they had incurred for us a burden so great that we decided together to lay it down". The Associated Press said that Margaret's statement was almost "a rededication of her life to the duties of royalty, making unlikely any marriage for her in the near future"; the princess may have expected to never marry after the long relationship ended, because most of her eligible male friends were no longer bachelors. Barrymaine agreed that Margaret intended the statement to mean that she would never marry, but wrote that Townsend likely did not accept any such vow to him by the princess, and his subsequent departure from Britain for two years was to not interfere with her life. "We both had a feeling of unimaginable relief. We were liberated at last from this monstrous problem", Townsend said.

After resigning from the RAF and travelling around the world for 18 months Townsend returned in March 1958; he and Margaret met several times, but could not avoid the press ("TOGETHER AGAIN") or royal disapproval. Townsend again left Britain to write a book about his trip; Barrymaine concluded in 1958 that "none of the fundamental obstacles to their marriage has been overcome – or shows any prospects of being overcome". Townsend said during a 1970 book tour that he and Margaret did not correspond and they had not seen each other since a "friendly" 1958 meeting, "just like I think a lot of people never see their old girl friends". Their love letters are in the Royal Archives and will not be available to the public until 100 years after Margaret's birth, February 2030. These are unlikely to include Margaret's letters. In 1959, she wrote to Townsend in response to him informing her of his remarriage plans, accusing him of betraying their vow not to marry anyone else and requesting her love letters to him be destroyed. He claimed he complied with her wishes, but kept this letter and an envelope of burned shards of the vow she had sent, eventually destroying these also. He was apparently unaware Margaret had already broken the pact by her engagement to Billy Wallace as it wasn't revealed until many years later. 

In October 1993, a friend of Margaret revealed she had met Townsend for what turned out to be the last time before his death in 1995. She hadn't wanted to attend the reunion they'd both been invited to, in 1992, for fear it might be picked up by the press, so she asked to see him privately instead. Margaret said that he looked "exactly the same, except he had grey hair". Guests said he hadn't really changed, and that they just sat chatting like old friends. They also found him disgruntled and had convinced himself that in agreeing to part, he and Margaret had set a noble example which seemed to have been in vain.

Marriage to Antony Armstrong-Jones

Billy Wallace later said that "The thing with Townsend was a girlish nonsense that got out of hand. It was never the big thing on her part that people claim". Margaret accepted one of Wallace's many proposals to marry in 1956, but the engagement ended before an official announcement when he admitted to a romance in the Bahamas; "I had my chance and blew it with my big mouth", Wallace said. Margaret did not reveal this publicly until an interview and subsequent biography with Nigel Dempster in 1977.

Margaret met the photographer Antony Armstrong-Jones at a supper party in 1958. They became engaged in October 1959. Armstrong-Jones proposed to Margaret with a ruby engagement ring surrounded by diamonds in the shape of a rosebud. She reportedly accepted his proposal a day after learning from Townsend that he intended to marry a young Belgian woman, Marie-Luce Jamagne, who was half his age and greatly resembled Margaret. Margaret's announcement of her engagement, on 26 February 1960, surprised the press, as she had concealed the romance from reporters.

Margaret married Armstrong-Jones at Westminster Abbey on 6 May 1960. The ceremony was the first royal wedding to be broadcast on television, and it attracted viewing figures of 300 million worldwide. 2,000 guests were invited for the wedding ceremony. Margaret's wedding dress was designed by Norman Hartnell and worn with the Poltimore tiara. She had eight young bridesmaids, led by her niece, Princess Anne. The Duke of Edinburgh escorted the bride, and the best man was Dr Roger Gilliatt. The Archbishop of Canterbury Geoffrey Fisher conducted the marriage service. Following the ceremony, the couple made the traditional appearance on the balcony of Buckingham Palace. The honeymoon was a six-week Caribbean cruise aboard the royal yacht Britannia. As a wedding present, Colin Tennant gave her a plot of land on his private Caribbean island, Mustique. The newlyweds moved into rooms in Kensington Palace.

In 1961, Margaret's husband was created Earl of Snowdon. The couple had two children (both born by Caesarean section at Margaret's request): David, born 3 November 1961, and Sarah, born 1 May 1964. The marriage widened Margaret's social circle beyond the Court and aristocracy to include show business celebrities and bohemians. At the time, it was thought to reflect the breaking down of British class barriers. The Snowdons experimented with the styles and fashions of the 1960s.

Separation and divorce
Both parties in the marriage regularly engaged in extra-marital relationships. Antony had a series of affairs, including with long-term mistress, Ann Hills, and Lady Jacqueline Rufus-Isaacs, daughter of the 3rd Marquess of Reading. Anne De Courcy’s 2008 biography summarises the situation with a quote from a close friend: "If it moves, he'll have it."

Reportedly, Margaret had her first extramarital affair in 1966, with her daughter's godfather Anthony Barton, a Bordeaux wine producer. A year later she had a one-month liaison with Robin Douglas-Home, a nephew of former British Prime Minister Alec Douglas-Home. Margaret claimed that her relationship with Douglas-Home was platonic, but her letters to him (which were later sold) were intimate. Douglas-Home, who suffered from depression, died by suicide 18 months after the split with Margaret. Claims that she was romantically involved with musician Mick Jagger, actor Peter Sellers, and Australian cricketer Keith Miller are unproven. According to biographer Charlotte Breese, entertainer Leslie Hutchinson had a "brief liaison" with Margaret in 1955. A 2009 biography of actor David Niven included assertions, based on information from Niven's widow and a good friend of Niven's, that he had had an affair with the princess, who was 20 years his junior. In 1975, the Princess was listed among women with whom actor Warren Beatty had had romantic relationships. John Bindon, an actor from Fulham, who had spent time in prison, sold his story to the Daily Mirror, boasting of a close relationship with Margaret.

Beyond extra-marital relationships, the marriage was accompanied by drugs, alcohol, and bizarre behaviour by both parties, such as his leaving lists of "things I hate about you" for the princess to find between the pages of books she read. According to biographer Sarah Bradford, one note read: "You look like a Jewish manicurist and I hate you".

By the early 1970s, the Snowdons had drifted apart. In September 1973, Colin Tennant introduced Margaret to Roddy Llewellyn. Llewellyn was 17 years her junior. In 1974, she invited him as a guest to Les Jolies Eaux, the holiday home she had built on Mustique. It was the first of several visits. Margaret described their relationship as "a loving friendship". Once, when Llewellyn left on an impulsive trip to Turkey, Margaret became emotionally distraught and took an overdose of sleeping tablets. "I was so exhausted because of everything", she later said, "that all I wanted to do was sleep". As she recovered, her ladies-in-waiting kept Lord Snowdon away from her, afraid that seeing him would distress her further.

In February 1976, a picture of Margaret and Llewellyn in swimsuits on Mustique was published on the front page of a tabloid, the News of the World. The press portrayed Margaret as a predatory older woman and Llewellyn as her toyboy lover. On 19 March 1976, the Snowdons publicly acknowledged that their marriage had irretrievably broken down and had decided to separate. Some politicians suggested removing Margaret from the civil list. Labour MPs denounced her as "a royal parasite" and a "floosie". On 24 May 1978, the decree nisi for their divorce was granted. In the same month, Margaret was taken ill, and diagnosed as suffering from gastroenteritis and alcoholic hepatitis, although Warwick denied that she was ever an alcoholic. On 11 July 1978, the Snowdons' divorce was finalized. It was the first divorce of a senior member of the British royal family since Princess Victoria Melita of Edinburgh's in 1901. On 15 December 1978, Snowdon married Lucy Lindsay-Hogg, but he and Margaret remained close friends.

In 1981, Llewellyn married Tatiana Soskin, whom he had known for 10 years. Margaret remained close friends with them both.

Public life

Among Margaret's first official engagements was launching the ocean liner Edinburgh Castle in Belfast in 1947. Subsequently, Margaret went on multiple tours of various places; in her first major tour she joined her parents and sister for a tour of South Africa in 1947. Her tour aboard Britannia to the British colonies in the Caribbean in 1955 created a sensation throughout the West Indies, and calypsos were dedicated to her. As colonies of the British Commonwealth of Nations sought nationhood, Princess Margaret represented the Crown at independence ceremonies in Jamaica in 1962 and Tuvalu and Dominica in 1978. Her visit to Tuvalu was cut short by an illness, which may have been viral pneumonia, and she was flown to Australia to recuperate. Other overseas tours included East Africa and Mauritius in 1956, the United States in 1965, Japan in 1969 and 1979, the United States and Canada in 1974, Australia in 1975, the Philippines in 1980, Swaziland in 1981, and China in 1987.

In August 1979, Louis Mountbatten, 1st Earl Mountbatten of Burma, and members of his family were killed by a bomb planted by the Provisional Irish Republican Army. That October, while on a fundraising tour of the United States on behalf of the Royal Opera House, Margaret was seated at a dinner reception in Chicago with columnist Abra Anderson and Mayor Jane Byrne. Margaret told them that the royal family had been moved by the many letters of condolence from Ireland. The following day, Anderson's rival Irv Kupcinet published a claim that Margaret had referred to the Irish as "pigs". Margaret, Anderson and Byrne all issued immediate denials, but the damage was already done. The rest of the tour drew demonstrations, and Margaret's security was doubled in the face of physical threats.

Charity work 
Her main interests were welfare charities, music and ballet. She was president of the National Society for the Prevention of Cruelty to Children (NSPCC) and of the Royal Scottish Society for the Prevention of Cruelty to Children (Children 1st) and Invalid Children's Aid Nationwide (also called 'I CAN'). She was Grand President of the St John Ambulance Brigade and Colonel-in-Chief of Queen Alexandra's Royal Army Nursing Corps. She was also the president or patron of numerous organisations, such as the West Indies Olympic Association, the Girl Guides, Northern Ballet Theatre, Birmingham Royal Ballet, Scottish Ballet, Tenovus Cancer Care, the Royal College of Nursing, and the London Lighthouse (an AIDS charity that has since merged with the Terrence Higgins Trust). In her capacity as president of the Royal Ballet, she played a key role in launching a fund for Dame Margot Fonteyn, who was experiencing financial troubles. With the help of the Children's Royal Variety Performance, she also organized yearly fundraisers for NSPCC. At some points Margaret was criticized for not being as active as other members of the royal family.

Illness and death

Margaret's later life was marred by illness and disability. She began smoking cigarettes in her early teens and had continued to smoke heavily for many years thereafter. In the 1970s, she suffered a nervous breakdown and was treated for depression by Mark Collins, a psychiatrist from the Priory Clinic. Later on, she suffered from migraines, laryngitis, and bronchitis. On 5 January 1985, she had part of her left lung removed; the operation drew parallels with that of her father 34 years earlier. In 1991, she gave up smoking, though she continued to drink heavily.

In January 1993, Margaret was admitted to hospital for pneumonia. She experienced a mild stroke on 23 February 1998 at her holiday home in Mustique. Early the following year, she suffered severe scalds to her feet in a bathroom accident, which affected her mobility in that she required support when walking and sometimes used a wheelchair. She was hospitalized on 10 January 2001, due to loss of appetite and swallowing problems after a further stroke. By March 2001, strokes had left her with partial vision and paralysis on the left side. Margaret's last public appearances were at the 101st birthday celebrations of her mother in August 2001, and the 100th birthday celebration of her aunt Princess Alice, Duchess of Gloucester, that December.

Princess Margaret died in the King Edward VII's Hospital, London, at 06:30 GMT on 9 February 2002, aged 71, three days after the 50th anniversary of her father's death. The previous day, she had suffered another stroke that was followed by cardiac problems. Her sister's eldest son, Charles, then Prince of Wales, paid tribute to his aunt in a television broadcast. UK politicians and foreign leaders sent their condolences as well. Following her death, private memorial services were held at St Mary Magdalene Church and Glamis Castle.

Margaret's coffin, draped in her personal standard, was taken from Kensington Palace to St James's Palace before her funeral. Her funeral was held on 15 February 2002, the 50th anniversary of her father's funeral. In line with her wishes, the ceremony was a private service at St George's Chapel, Windsor Castle, for family and friends. Unlike most other members of the royal family, Princess Margaret was cremated, at Slough Crematorium. Her ashes were temporarily placed in the Royal Vault of St George's Chapel, before being moved to the King George VI Memorial Chapel in St George's, following the funeral of her mother in April 2002 (who had died seven weeks after Margaret). A state memorial service was held at Westminster Abbey on 19 April 2002. Another memorial service to mark the 10th anniversary of Margaret and the Queen Mother's death was held on 30 March 2012 at St George's Chapel, Windsor Castle, which was attended by Queen Elizabeth II and other members of the royal family.

Legacy

Image

Observers often characterized Margaret as a spoiled snob capable of cutting remarks and hauteur. Critics claimed that she even looked down on her grandmother Queen Mary because Mary was born a princess with the lower "Serene Highness" style, whereas Margaret was a "Royal Highness" by birth. Their letters, however, provide no indication of friction between them.

Margaret could also be charming and informal. People who came into contact with her could be perplexed by her swings between frivolity and formality. Former governess Marion Crawford wrote in her memoir: "Impulsive and bright remarks she made became headlines and, taken out of their context, began to produce in the public eye an oddly distorted personality that bore little resemblance to the Margaret we knew."

Margaret's acquaintance Gore Vidal, the American writer, wrote: "She was far too intelligent for her station in life". He recalled a conversation with Margaret in which, discussing her public notoriety, she said: "It was inevitable, when there are two sisters and one is the Queen, who must be the source of honour and all that is good, while the other must be the focus of the most creative malice, the evil sister".

As a child, Margaret enjoyed pony shows, but unlike other family members she did not express interest in hunting, shooting, and fishing in adulthood. She became interested in ballet from a very young age and enjoyed participating in amateur plays. She directed one such play, titled The Frogs, with her aristocratic friends as cast members. Actors and movie stars were among the regular visitors to her residence at Kensington Palace. In January 1981, she was the castaway in an episode of BBC Radio 4's Desert Island Discs. There she chose Pyotr Ilyich Tchaikovsky’s Swan Lake as her favourite piece of music. In 1984, she appeared as herself in an episode of the radio drama The Archers, becoming the first member of the royal family to take part in a BBC drama.

Princess Margaret's private life was for many years the subject of intense speculation by media and royalty watchers. Her house on Mustique, designed by her husband's uncle Oliver Messel, a stage designer, was her favourite holiday destination. Allegations of wild parties and drug taking also surfaced in the media.

Following Margaret's death, her lady-in-waiting, Lady Glenconner, said that "[Margaret] was devoted to the Queen and tremendously supportive of her". Margaret was described by her cousin Lady Elizabeth Shakerley as "somebody who had a wonderful capacity for giving a lot of people pleasure and she was making a very, very, very good and loyal friend". Another cousin, Lord Lichfield, said that "[Margaret] was pretty sad towards the end of her life because it was a life unfulfilled".

The Independent wrote in Townsend's 1995 obituary that "The immense display of popular sentiment and interest [in the relationship] can now be seen to have constituted a watershed in the nation's attitude towards divorce". The Archbishop of Canterbury and the Church received much of the popular anger toward the end of the relationship. Randolph Churchill believed that rumours "that Fisher had intervened to prevent the Princess from marrying Townsend has done incalculable harm to the Church of England"; a Gallup poll found that 28% agreed, and 59% disagreed, with the Church's refusal to remarry a divorced person while the other spouse was alive. Biographer Warwick suggests that Margaret's most enduring legacy is an accidental one. Perhaps unwittingly, Margaret paved the way for public acceptance of royal divorce. Her life, if not her actions, made the decisions and choices of her sister's children, three of whom divorced, easier than they otherwise would have been.

Eden reportedly told the Queen in Balmoral when discussing Margaret and Townsend that, regardless of outcome, the monarchy would be damaged. Harold Brooks-Baker said "In my opinion, this was the turning point to disaster for the royal family. After Princess Margaret was denied marriage, it backfired and more or less ruined Margaret's life. The Queen decided that from then on, anyone someone in her family wanted to marry would be more or less acceptable. The royal family and the public now feel that they've gone too far in the other direction".

Fashion and style

During her lifetime, Princess Margaret was considered a fashion icon. Her fashion earned the nickname 'The Margaret Look'. The princess, dubbed a 'royal rebel' styled herself in contrast to her sister's prim and timeless style, adopting trendy mod accessories, such as brightly coloured headscarves and glamorous sunglasses. Margaret developed a close relationship with atelier Christian Dior, wearing his designs throughout her life and becoming one of his most prominent customers. In 1950, he designed a cream gown worn for her 21st birthday, which has been cited as an iconic part of fashion history. Throughout the decade, the princess was known for wearing floral-print dresses, bold-hued ballgowns and luxurious fabrics, accessorising with diamonds, pearls, and fur stoles. British Vogue wrote that Margaret's style 'hit her stride' in the mid-60s, where she was photographed alongside celebrities like The Beatles, Frank Sinatra and Sophia Loren. Princess Margaret was also known for her "magnificent" hats and headdresses, including a canary feather hat worn on a 1962 Jamaica visit and a peacock feather pillbox hat to the 1973 Royal Ascot. Marie Claire stated that the princess "refused to compromise" on her style later in life, continuing with trends of big sleeves and strapless evening gowns.

In April 2007, an exhibition titled Princess Line – The Fashion Legacy of Princess Margaret opened at Kensington Palace, showcasing contemporary fashion from British designers such as Vivienne Westwood inspired by Princess Margaret's legacy of style. Christopher Bailey's Spring 2006 collection for Burberry was inspired by Margaret's look from the 1960s.

Finances
In her lifetime, Margaret's fortune was estimated to be around £20 million, with most of it being inherited from her father. She also inherited pieces of art and antiques from Queen Mary, and Dame Margaret Greville left her £20,000 in 1943. In 1999, her son, Lord Linley, sold his mother's Caribbean residence Les Jolies Eaux for a reported £2.4 million. At the time of her death Margaret received £219,000 from the Civil List. Following her death, she left a £7.6 million estate to her two children, which was cut down to £4.5 million after inheritance tax. In June 2006, much of Margaret's estate was auctioned by Christie's to meet the tax and, in her son's words, "normal family requirements such as educating her grandchildren", though some of the items were sold in aid of charities such as the Stroke Association. Reportedly, the Queen had made it clear that the proceeds from any item that was given to her sister in an official capacity must be donated to charities. A world record price of £1.24 million was set by a Fabergé clock. The Poltimore Tiara, which she wore for her wedding in 1960, sold for £926,400. The sale of her effects totalled £13,658,000.

In popular culture
Actresses who have portrayed Margaret include Lucy Cohu (The Queen's Sister, 2005), Katie McGrath (The Queen, 2009), Ramona Marquez (The King's Speech, 2010), Bel Powley (A Royal Night Out, 2015), and Vanessa Kirby, Helena Bonham Carter, and Lesley Manville, who all played different stages of Margaret's life during The Crown, 2016–present. The 2008 bank heist movie, The Bank Job, revolves around alleged photos of Margaret. The character "Pantomime Princess Margaret" appeared in four separate sketches, in three different episodes, of the BBC's 1970s surreal comedy show Monty Python's Flying Circus.

Titles, styles, honours and arms

Titles and styles

21 August 1930 – 11 December 1936: Her Royal Highness Princess Margaret Rose of York
11 December 1936 – 6 October 1961: Her Royal Highness The Princess Margaret
6 October 1961 – 9 February 2002: Her Royal Highness The Princess Margaret, Countess of Snowdon

Honours

Companion of the Order of the Crown of India, CI 12 June 1947
Dame of Justice of the Order of St John of Jerusalem, DJStJ 23 June 1948
Dame Grand Cross of the Royal Victorian Order, GCVO 1 June 1953
Dame Grand Cross of the Order of St John of Jerusalem, GCStJ 20 June 1956
Royal Victorian Chain, 21 August 1990
Royal Family Order of King George V
Royal Family Order of King George VI
Royal Family Order of Queen Elizabeth II

Foreign honours
: Grand Cross of the Order of the Netherlands Lion, 1948
: Order of the Brilliant Star of Zanzibar, First Class, 1956
: Grand Cross of the Order of the Crown, 1960
: Order of the Crown, Lion, and Spear of Toro Kingdom, 1965
: Order of the Precious Crown, First Class, 5 October 1971

Honorary military appointments
 Australia
 Colonel-in-Chief of the Women's Royal Australian Army Corps

 Bermuda
 Colonel-in-Chief of the Bermuda Regiment

 Canada
 Colonel-in-Chief of the Royal Highland Fusiliers of Canada
 Colonel-in-Chief of the Princess Louise Fusiliers
 Colonel-in-Chief of the Royal Newfoundland Regiment

 New Zealand
 Colonel-in-Chief of the Northland Regiment

 United Kingdom
 Colonel-in-Chief of the 15th/19th The King's Royal Hussars
 Colonel-in-Chief of the Light Dragoons
 Colonel-in-Chief of the Royal Highland Fusiliers (Princess Margaret's Own Glasgow and Ayrshire Regiment)
 Colonel-in-Chief of the Queen Alexandra's Royal Army Nursing Corps
 Deputy Colonel-in-Chief of the Royal Anglian Regiment
 Honorary Air Commodore, Royal Air Force Coningsby

Awards
Queen Elizabeth II Coronation Award, 2003

Arms

Issue

Ancestry

References

Bibliography

External links

 Profile on the official site of the British Monarchy
 HRH Princess Margaret 1930–2002 at BBC News
 Death of Princess Margaret
 British Columbia Archives: video of Princess Margaret at a reception, HMS Hood Discovery, 1958
 

 
 

 
 

 
1930 births
2002 deaths
20th-century British people
20th-century British women
21st-century British people
21st-century British women
Anglo-Scots
Armstrong-Jones family
Snowdon
British princesses
Burials at St George's Chapel, Windsor Castle
Chancellors of Keele University
Companions of the Order of the Crown of India
Daughters of kings
Daughters of emperors
Dames Grand Cross of the Royal Victorian Order
Dames Grand Cross of the Order of St John
Girlguiding officials
Grand Crosses of the Order of the Crown (Belgium)
Grand Cordons of the Order of the Precious Crown
Honorary air commodores
Margaret
Jewellery collectors
People from Angus, Scotland
Recipients of the Silver Fish Award
Wives of knights